Norman McLeod Paterson, KGStJ, DCL, LLD (August 3, 1883 – August 10, 1983) was a Canadian businessman and politician.

Life and career
Born in Portage la Prairie, Manitoba, the son of Hugh Savigny Paterson and Ella Snider, he started working with the Manitoba Railway and Canal Company in 1897. Paterson later worked for the Great Northern Railway of Canada as a telegrapher, eventually becoming a purchasing agent

In 1903, he started working with his father in the grain business and founded a firm, N.M Paterson and Company, in 1908. Later, he started Paterson Steamships Limited. The two firms later became N.M. Paterson and Sons Limited, which is still run by the Paterson family.

According to the Manitoba marriage registration (1915-176082), Paterson married Eleanor Margaret Macdonald in Winnipeg on June 2, 1915.

He was summoned to the Senate of Canada in 1940, representing the senatorial division of Milton, Ontario. A Liberal, he resigned in 1981 just before his 98th birthday. He was made a Knight of the Order of St. John in 1945.

From 1965 to 1971, he was the first chancellor of Lakehead University. He also served on the Board of Directors of Carleton University in Ottawa. The Norman Paterson School of International Affairs was established in 1965 at Carleton University with a grant of $400,000 from Paterson. Paterson died in his sleep at his home in Ottawa on August 10, 1983, a week after his 100th birthday.

In 1970, he established a private charitable foundation, The Paterson Foundation, which provides grants to community organizations in Saskatchewan, Manitoba and Northwestern Ontario.

References

External links
 
 Paterson Grain 
 Paterson Foundation 
 Memorable Manitobans: Hugh Savigny Paterson (1855-1936)

1883 births
1983 deaths
20th-century Canadian businesspeople
Canadian centenarians
Men centenarians
Canadian senators from Ontario
Canadian university and college chancellors
Knights of Grace of the Order of St John
Liberal Party of Canada senators
People from Portage la Prairie